Gerardo Turcatti (born 1959 in Montevideo, Uruguay) is a Swiss-Uruguayan chemist who specialises in chemical biology and drug discovery. He is a professor at the École Polytechnique Fédérale de Lausanne (EPFL) and director of the Biomolecular Screening Facility at the School of Life Sciences there.

Career 
Turcatti studied chemistry at the University of the Republic in Uruguay. In 1981, he moved to Switzerland to earn a Master's degree in chemical engineering from the University of Geneva. Discovering the world of life sciences while working at the biotech company Biogen during his studies, he pursued a career as a chemical biologist. While working at the Glaxo Biomedical Research Institute in Geneva, he studied under Professor Horst Vogel at EPFL for an industry PhD thesis in chemistry and biochemistry titled "Novel fluorescence-based approaches to probe ligand recognition and structure of the tachykinin NK2 receptor". His thesis earned him the EPFL Doctorate Award in 1996.

Until 1997 he was a research scientist at the Biochemistry Department of the Glaxo Wellcome Biomedical Research Institute, where he further adapted the methodologies he developed during his PhD to other G protein-coupled receptors (GPCR).  In 1998 he went to work as a senior scientist at the Genomic Technologies Department of the Serono Pharmaceutical Research Institute.

As a spin-off of Serono, in January 2001, he co-founded Manteia Predictive Medicine and became executive technology director. The Swiss-based company invented and developed novel high throughput DNA sequencing technologies currently owned by Illumina.

In 2006, after a 20 year career in biotechnology and pharmaceutical companies, he founded the Biomolecular Screening Facility (BSF) at EPFL and has been its director since its inception. In 2020, Turcatti became Adjunct Professor at EPFL. In the framework of the NCCR research project on chemical biology, he is the project leader of the Swiss academic platform for chemical screens (ACCESS project).

Research 
Turcatti's industrial research has led to DNA sequencing technologies performing at higher throughput rates. He developed, amongst others, novel surface chemistries for DNA attachment; prior to in situ massively parallel amplification of DNA templates; a DNA sequencing method using chemically engineered fluorescent nucleotide transient terminators; and a fluorescent microscopy setup enabling high throughput low cost whole genome analysis. Some of these DNA-related technologies he co-developed have been implemented in commercial instruments produced by Illumina.

More recently, Turcatti’s research interests have shifted towards bioactive probes and drug discovery. The current academic research of his laboratory focuses on innovative high throughput screening methods and technologies for efficient early drug discovery processes enabling more specific and safer molecules as therapeutic agents, this includes drug repurposing strategies for application in various therapeutic areas.

His research also targets the development of efficient methods for drug screening such as highly informative assays. By developing image-based high content screening methods to estimate efficacy, potency and early detection of off-target effects of potential drugs, they aim to contribute to the acceleration of the drug discovery process.

Distinctions 
Turcatti is a member of the scientific advisory board of ChemBioFrance, the scientific advisory board of Innopharma, and the European Cellular Assays Interest Group (EuCAI), and the editorial board of the journal Combinatorial Chemistry and High Throughput Screening.

Selected works

References

External links 
 
 Website of the Biomolecular Screening Facility

1959 births
Living people
University of the Republic (Uruguay) alumni
University of Geneva alumni
Academic staff of the École Polytechnique Fédérale de Lausanne
Swiss chemists